Ground radar (cf. airborne radar system) is a radar positioned on the ground and used for air defense (e.g., ground-controlled interception), command guidance (e.g., ground-directed bombing), air traffic control (i.e., radar control), instrument landing systems, radar bomb scoring, etc..  Ground radar may refer to:
 Air Route Surveillance Radar
 Airport surveillance radar
 Counter-battery radar
 Fire-control radar for ground weapon systems (e.g., Nike missile command guidance)
 Ground-penetrating radar when used from a ground site
 Precision approach radar
 Secondary surveillance radar
 Target acquisition radar
 Weather radar for measurements from the ground (e.g., for local news reports)

Technology-related lists
Radar